Dashtgharan (also Romanized as Dashtgharān and Dasht-e Gharrān; also known as Dashgharrān, Dasht-e Qarān, and Dasht-e Qarān) is a village in Golshan Rural District, in the Central District of Tabas County, South Khorasan Province, Iran. At the 2006 census, its population was 1,835, in 428 families.

References 

Populated places in Tabas County